Ramnagar (also spelt Ramnagore) is a locality of Asansol Municipal Corporation in Asansol of Paschim Bardhaman district in the Indian state of West Bengal. It has come up with the Ramnagar colliery, once a captive mine of IISCO, now part of Steel Authority of India Limited.Ramnagar is best place for housing . Here all people are Hindu. Ramnagar village near (500mt) barakar river so this kind of reasons here temperature is very comparable.here winter season temperature is 8 degree and summer season temperature is 42 to 45 degree.

Geography

Asansol Municipal Corporation
According to the Kolkata Gazette notification of 3 June 2015, the municipal areas of Kulti, Raniganj and Jamuria were included within the jurisdiction of Asansol Municipal Corporation.

References

Neighbourhoods in Asansol